The Berwick was an electric car manufactured in Grand Rapids, Michigan, by the Berwick Auto Car Company in 1904. The Berwick was an electric two-seater runabout selling for $750.

See also
List of defunct United States automobile manufacturers
History of the electric vehicle

Other Early Electric Vehicles
American Electric 
Argo Electric
Babcock Electric Carriage Company
Binghamton Electric
Buffalo Electric
Century
Columbia Automobile Company
Dayton Electric
Detroit Electric
Grinnell
Menominee
Rauch and Lang 
Riker Electric

References
 

Electric vehicles introduced in the 20th century
Veteran vehicles
Defunct motor vehicle manufacturers of the United States
Motor vehicle manufacturers based in Michigan
Cars introduced in 1904
Vehicle manufacturing companies established in 1904
1904 establishments in Michigan
Defunct manufacturing companies based in Michigan
Defunct brands